Maluku may refer to:

Places
 Maluku Islands, an archipelago that is part of Indonesia
 List of the Maluku Islands
 Maluku (province), a province of Indonesia comprising the central and southern parts of the archipelago
 North Maluku, a province of Indonesia comprising the northern parts of the archipelago
 Republic of South Maluku, 1950s insurgency in central Maluku Province and its government in exile
 Maluku, Kinshasa, a commune in Kinshasa, Democratic Republic of the Congo

Other uses
 Central Maluku languages, a group of fifty Austronesian languages